Charles James McCoy was an American college football and basketball coach.  McCoy was the third head coach of the Florida Gators football team and the first head coach of the Florida Gators men's basketball team that represent the University of Florida in Gainesville, Florida.

Early life 

McCoy attended Miami University in Oxford, Ohio, where he played for the Miami Redskins football team from 1907 to 1910.  He was a member of the 1908 Redskins team that outscored its opponents 113–10 while posting a 7–0 record, and was later the captain of the 1910 team during his senior year.  McCoy also played baseball and basketball and ran track for Miami.

Coaching career 

McCoy got his start as a football coach at the Sewanee Military Academy, a preparatory school affiliated with the University of the South in Sewanee, Tennessee.  McCoy replaced George E. Pyle as the Florida Gators football coach and held that position for three seasons from 1914 to 1916, and compiled a 9–10 record at Florida.  He also served as Florida's first basketball coach during the 1915–1916 season and accumulated a 5–1 record.  As measured by his winning percentage (.833), McCoy remains the winningest coach in Gators basketball history.  Florida did not field a basketball team for the 1916–1917 season.

After a winless 0–5 football season in 1916, McCoy was replaced as football coach by Alfred L. Buser.

McCoy served as the head coach at Ohio Wesleyan University in 1917.

Head coaching record

Football

Basketball

See also
 List of Miami University people

References

Bibliography 

  2012 Florida Football Media Guide, University Athletic Association, Gainesville (2012).
 Carlson, Norm, University of Florida Football Vault: The History of the Florida Gators, Whitman Publishing, LLC, Atlanta, Georgia (2007).  .
 Golenbock, Peter, Go Gators!  An Oral History of Florida's Pursuit of Gridiron Glory, Legends Publishing, LLC, St. Petersburg, Florida (2002).  .
 McCarthy, Kevin M.,  Fightin' Gators: A History of University of Florida Football, Arcadia Publishing, Mount Pleasant, South Carolina (2000).  .
 McEwen, Tom, The Gators: A Story of Florida Football, The Strode Publishers, Huntsville, Alabama (1974).  .
 Proctor, Samuel, & Wright Langley, Gator History: A Pictorial History of the University of Florida, South Star Publishing Company, Gainesville, Florida (1986).  .

Year of birth missing
Year of death missing
Florida Gators football coaches
Florida Gators men's basketball coaches
Miami RedHawks football players
Ohio Wesleyan Battling Bishops football coaches
High school football coaches in Tennessee